is a Japanese animator, animation director, and storyboard artist.

Filmography

Director

Television series

OVAs

Films

Other

Television series

OVAs/ONAs

Films

Adult Anime

Notes

References

External links

Takeo Takahashi anime at Media Arts Database 

Anime directors
Living people
Year of birth missing (living people)